Morling is a surname. Notable people with the surname include:

George Morling (1891–1974), Australian Baptist minister
Malena Mörling (born 1965), Swedish poet
Edgar A. Morling (1864–1932), Justice of the Iowa Supreme Court

See also
Morling College, in Australia
Mörlin (surname)